The Sanitary Market (also known as the Sanitary Market Building or the Sanitary Public Market) is a building at Seattle's Pike Place Market, in the U.S. state of Washington.

History 
The building opened in 1910 and burned in a large fire in 1941. Business which have operated in the building include El Mercado Latino, Jack's Fish Spot and Three Girls Bakery.

References

External links
 

1910 establishments in Washington (state)
Buildings and structures completed in 1910
Buildings and structures in Seattle
Central Waterfront, Seattle
Pike Place Market